Regina School Division #4, also known as Regina Public Schools (RPS), is the Anglophone secular public school district of Regina, Saskatchewan, Canada. Its headquarters, J.A. Burnett Education Centre, was named after teacher Jim Burnett.

 the school district collects ethnicity data on registration forms, but there is also an anonymous self-reporting Tell Them From Me survey which collects self-reported data. The latter has higher percentages of students with First Nations ancestry declared compared to the former.

In 2021 there was a proposal for diversity training for every person working for the school district. All members of the school board voted in favor to enact this.

History
The headquarters received its current name in 1985.

In 2020 the board had more new members than returning members.

In September 2020 board member Jane Ekong released a report about the experiences of Black Canadian students in the district.

Schools

High schools
 Balfour Collegiate
 Campbell Collegiate
 F.W. Johnson Collegiate
 Winston Knoll Collegiate
 Martin Collegiate
 Scott Collegiate
 Sheldon-Williams Collegiate
 Thom Collegiate

Elementary schools
 Albert Community Elementary School
 Arcola Community Elementary School
 Argyle Elementary School
 Henry Braun Elementary School
 Judge Bryant Elementary School
 Ruth M. Buck Elementary School
 Centennial Community Elementary School
 M.J. Coldwell Elementary School
 Connaught Community Elementary School
 Coronation Park Community Elementary School
 The Crescents Elementary School
 Douglas Park Elementary School
 Dr. George Ferguson Elementary School
 W.H. Ford. Elementary School
 Glen Elm Community Elementary School
 Grant Road Elementary School
 Dr. L.M. Hanna Elementary School
 Harbour Landing Elementary School
 W.S. Hawrylak Elementary School
 Wilfred Hunt Elementary School
 Imperial Community Elementary School
 Henry Janzen Elementary School
 Kitchener Community Elementary School
 Lakeview Elementary School
 George Lee Elementary School
 Jack MacKenzie Elementary School
 MacNeill Elementary School
 Massey Elementary School
 McDermid Community Elementary School
 Gladys McDonald Elementary School
 McLurg Elementary School
 Marion McVeety Elementary School
 Ethel Milliken Elementary School
 Elsie Mironuck Community Elementary School
 Ruth Pawson Elementary School
 Dr. A.E. Perry Elementary School
 Plainsview Elementary School
 W.F. Ready Elementary School
 Rosemont Community Elementary School
 Seven Stones Community Elementary School
 Thomson Community Elementary School
 Walker Elementary School
 Wilfrid Walker Elementary School
 Wascana Plains Elementary School

Former schools
 Cochrane High School
 Ken Jenkins School - An October 2009 meeting of the RPS board identified it as one of the schools with the smallest number of students, and RPS closed it in 2010. The school was vandalized on multiple occasions, and as of 2020 there are plans to demolish it.

See also
 List of schools in Regina, Saskatchewan

References

External links
 Regina Public Schools
 Articles about Regina Public Schools - Leader Post

School divisions in Saskatchewan
Education in Regina, Saskatchewan